The voiceless alveolar trill differs from the voiced alveolar trill  only by the vibrations of the vocal cord. It occurs in a few languages, usually alongside the voiced version, as a similar phoneme or an allophone.

PIE  > Ancient Greek ῥέω "flow", possibly

Features
Features of the voiceless alveolar trill:

Its place of articulation is dental, alveolar or post-alveolar, which means it is articulated behind upper front teeth, at the alveolar ridge or behind the alveolar ridge. It is most often apical, which means that it is pronounced with the tip of the tongue.

Occurrence
Alveolar

Voiceless alveolar fricative trill

The voiceless alveolar fricative trill is not known to occur as a phoneme in any language, except possibly the East Sakhalin dialect of Nivkh. It occurs allophonically in Czech.

Features
Features of the voiceless alveolar fricative trill:

Its manner of articulation is fricative trill, which means it is a non-sibilant fricative and a trill pronounced simultaneously.
Its place of articulation is laminal alveolar, which means it is articulated with the blade of the tongue at the alveolar ridge,

Occurrence

See also
Index of phonetics articles

Notes

References

External links
 

Alveolar consonants
Trill consonants
Pulmonic consonants
Voiceless oral consonants
Central consonants